José Pedro Rodrigues Alves (born 29 March 1986), commonly known as Zé Pedro, is a Portuguese footballer who plays for C.F. Caniçal as a central defender.

Football career
Born in Funchal, Madeira, Zé Pedro joined S.C. Braga's youth system in 2002 at the age of 16, but only appeared in one game for the reserves during his spell, in the third division. Subsequently, he returned to his native region, going on to spend one season in the fourth level with U.D. Santana.

Zé Pedro's professional input consisted of two matches in Liga II with Romania's CS Otopeni, in the 2007–08 campaign. After three years in his country's division three, with U.D. Santana, A.D. Pontassolense and CF Andorinha, he resumed his career in amateur football.

In September 2008, Zé Pedro went on trial with Football League One club Leyton Orient, but nothing came of it.

References

External links

1986 births
Living people
Sportspeople from Funchal
Portuguese footballers
Madeiran footballers
Association football defenders
Segunda Divisão players
C.F. União players
S.C. Braga B players
Liga II players
CS Otopeni players
Portugal youth international footballers
Portuguese expatriate footballers
Expatriate footballers in Romania